Sanford Prince (foaled 1985 in Great Britain) was a Barbadian thoroughbred racehorse that was the first horse to win three editions of the Barbados Gold Cup.

Trained by Australian Racing Hall of Fame inductee, Scobie Breasley for owner Sir David Seale, he was ridden to victory in each of his three Gold Cups by jockey, Venice Richards.

References
 Sanford Prince's pedigree and partial racing stats

1985 racehorse births
Thoroughbred family 13-e
Racehorses bred in the United Kingdom
Racehorses trained in Barbados